USS S-10 (SS-115) was a second-group ( or "Government") S-class submarine of the United States Navy. Her keel was laid down on 11 September 1919 by the Portsmouth Navy Yard. She was launched on 9 December 1920 sponsored by Miss Marian K. Payne, and commissioned on 21 September 1922.

Following duty off the northeast coast, S-10 visited the Panama Canal area, St. Thomas, and Trinidad and Tobago in early 1924 and completed that year along the northeast coast. Sailing from Boston, Massachusetts on 19 February 1925, S-10 voyaged via the Panama Canal and California to Hawaii, arriving on 27 April. She returned to New London, Connecticut on 12 July and completed that year in New England waters. In addition to duty out of New London from 1926-1928, S-10 operated in the Panama Canal area from February–April 1926, visited Guantanamo Bay and Kingston in March 1927, and served again at the Panama Canal from February–March 1928. From 1929-1936, S-10 served almost exclusively in the Panama Canal area, although she visited Memphis, Tennessee from 11–15 May 1933, and was in reserve, with a partial crew, at Coco Solo from 1 July-27 November that year.

Departing Coco Solo on 30 March 1936, S-10 was decommissioned on 17 July that year at Philadelphia, Pennsylvania, and struck from the Naval Vessel Register. She was sold on 13 November for scrapping.

References

Ships built in Kittery, Maine
S-10
1920 ships